Type 922 rescue and salvage ship is a series of rescue and salvage ships developed by China for the People's Liberation Army Navy (PLAN), and after decades of service they still remain active in other Chinese governmental establishments.

Type 922
Type 922 is the first model of Type 922 series, and it was converted from a 3400-ton cargo ship transferred from Ministry of Transportation. Order to develop rescue and salvage ship was issued on October 27, 1960 and on July 16, 1962, the design was approved. Construction begun in early 1964 after nearly a year of preparation and in July 1965, the ship was launched. The ship was formally handed to PLAN in December 1966 as Hai-Jiu (海救, meaning Sea Rescue) 403.

Type 922II
Type 922II is the development resulted from experience gained from the deployment of Type 922II.On May 5, 1970, a dedicated design was proposed by to the 708th Institute of China State Shipbuilding Corporation, which is also more commonly known as China Shipbuilding and Oceanic Engineering Design Academy (中国船舶及海洋工程设计研究)  nowadays. On April 15, 1971, design review of the design begun at Guangzhou. Construction begun at Guangzhou Shipyard International on September 20, 1971, and the ship was launched on September 27, 1973. Sea trials begun in August 1975 and was concluded on January 10, 1976. Test for rescue operations begun on April 23, 1976 and was concluded on June 14, 1976. The ship was formally handed over to PLAN on June 30, 1976 with pennant number as Nan-Jiu (南救, meaning South Rescue) 503, and received NATO reporting name as Dalang (大浪), meaning Big Wave in Chinese. After three decades of service, Type 922II was transferred to Chinese Fishery Administration on November 27, 2006 and remains active to this day. Specification:
Length (m): 113.5
Width (m): 15.5
Displacement (t): 4450
Speed: 
Range: 
Endurance (day): 50

Type 922III
Type 922III was originally planned in 1978, but original design had to be modified to meet the updated requirement. In September 1982, design work was completed and construction begun on December 20, 1982 at Wuchang Shipyard. The ship was originally scheduled to be built by Guangzhou Shipyard International but a decision was made on May 27, 1982  to have it built at Wuchang Shipyard instead. Type 922III was launched on May 20, 1983, and after traveling to Shanghai, begun sea trials on April 17, 1986. Further tests were conducted in Zhoushan from May 28 to June 17, 1986, and in Qingdao and Dalian from July 21 to September 2, 1986. Trials revealed some modification was needed and after such modifications were completed, the ship was formally handed to PLAN as Bei-Jiu (北救, meaning North Rescue in Chinese) 122 in Qingdao on March 31, 1987. Type 922III is armed with twin 37 mm guns and received NATO reporting name Dalang II class.

Type 922IIIA
Type 912IIA is the improvement of earlier Type 912III. The obvious external difference between Type 912IIIA and its predecessor Type 912III is minor and both share the same NATO reporting name Dalang.II class. A total of three ships were built with one serving in each fleet. Type 922IIIA ships in PLAN service are designated by a combination of two Chinese characters followed by three-digit number. The second Chinese character is Jiu (救), meaning rescue in Chinese, because these ships are rescue and salvage ships. The first Chinese character denotes which fleet the ship is service with, with East (Dong, 东) for East Sea Fleet, North (Bei, 北) for North Sea Fleet, and South (Nan, 南) for South Sea Fleet. The pennant numbers have changed or some units due to the change of Chinese naval ships naming convention. Type 922IIIA has received NATO reporting name Dalang III class.

Ships
Original names of some of the ships in the table might have been changed after transferring to different governmental establishments.

References

Auxiliary ships of the People's Liberation Army Navy
Auxiliary search and rescue ship classes